United Nations Security Council Resolution 321, adopted on October 23, 1972, after reaffirming previous resolutions, the Council expressed its concern that Portugal persistently refused to comply with them.  The Council attacked the latest cross-border action by the Portuguese army against Senegalese territory and demanded that the Portuguese cease any further acts of violence.  The Council went on to reaffirm their position that Portugal's continued holding of colonies in Africa was unjust and that the native peoples of those colonies should be allowed self-determination.

The resolution was adopted with 12 votes to none, while Belgium, the United Kingdom and United States abstained.

See also
 List of United Nations Security Council Resolutions 301 to 400 (1971–1976)
 Portuguese Colonial War
 Portuguese Empire

References 
Text of the Resolution at undocs.org

External links
 

 0321
20th century in Portugal
 0321
Portuguese Guinea
 0321
 0321
October 1972 events